Fábio Deivson Lopes Maciel, simply known as Fábio (born 30 September 1980) is a Brazilian footballer who plays as a goalkeeper for Fluminense. He currently has the 4th most official appearances ever for a professional football player.

Career

Club career 
Born in Nobres, Mato Grosso, Fábio represented União Bandeirante-PR, Atlético-PR and Vasco, where he won the Campeonato Brasileiro and the Copa Mercosur in 2000. He returned to Cruzeiro in 2005 in an exchange for the striker Alex Dias, having played for the club in 2000 and winning the Copa do Brasil at the time.

In the first half of 2007, Fabio's performance on the field was inconsistent and very consequential mistakes. In the first leg of the state championship against rivals Atlético, he had his back to the field while the Atlético striker approached the box and scored; Cruzeiro supporters asked for his removal from the starting squad. Coincidentally, after this same game, Fábio was out for three months for an alleged injury, although he played the whole match during which he did not show any sign of severe pain. He returned to his starter position in the middle of July and became a favorite of the Cruzeiro fans, showing signs of recovering his old form.

In November 2007 it was announced that Fabio would extend his Cruzeiro contract until December 2009 after speculation mounted on a possible move in the January 2008 transfer period. In April 2008, it was reported that he would move to Fiorentina, subject to application on obtaining an EU passport as under descendant status, but the move never happened.

During both the 2013 and 2014 Campeonato Brasileiro Série A winning campaigns, Fábio served as Cruzeiro's captain and thus lifting the Brasileirão trophy twice in a row for the team. Fábio was selected in 2013 as the best goalkeeper in Brazil, winning the prestigious Bola de Prata trophy for the position for the second time, having also been honored in 2010.

Fábio is currently the record holder for most appearances for Cruzeiro, with over 950 matches played for the Brazilian club.

On 5 January 2022, he announced on his Instagram account that he would leave the club after 17 seasons, because of a problem renewing his contract. The goalkeeper left Cruzeiro with 976 games played and twelve titles won.

On 21 January 2022, Fábio joined Fluminense.

On 4 February 2022, Fábio made his debut for Fluminense in a game against Audax Rio, becoming the oldest footballer to play for them, with 41 years and 120 days, surpassing the record of Magno Alves (40 years and 312 days).

International career 
Fábio was the starting goalkeeper in the 1997 U-17 South American Youth Championship and FIFA U-17 World Cup winning campaigns. Along with that, he was an unused substitute in Brazil's squad in the 2003 FIFA Confederations Cup and in the winning side in the 2004 Copa América, in Peru.

Fábio was called up to most of Brazil's friendlies in August and September 2006. Being called up by Brazilian head coach Dunga for a friendly against Norway in Oslo on 16 August 2006, though never had playing time, the game ended 1–1. He was also called up to play against Argentina and Wales on 3 and 5 September 2006, respectively, but again, he did not play in these matches, as Gomes remained Brazil's number 1 under Dunga at that time.

He was included in one of Brazil's teams in September, but knew exactly where he stood and understood what his role in the team was, and stated he was happy to be part of the squad.

After more than four years, Fábio was called up to the national team in 2011 for the friendly matches against Netherlands and Romania, failing to make his international debut in any of the matches. A few weeks later he was included in the preliminary squad for the 2011 Copa América by coach Mano Menezes, but was eventually cut from the final squad of 23.

In 2013, he publicly complained about not having an opportunity to play for the national side and claimed that "it has no criteria in the goalkeepers selection". He made the same complaints in 2014, prior to the World Cup and in 2018. Some journalists as well as the Brazilian football fans criticize his exclusion from the national team even with the alternance of coaches in the past few years (Scolari, Dunga, Tite); Fabio is the most remembered player for this continued exclusion from the national team, along with winger Lucas Moura.

Career statistics

Honours

Club 
Atlético Paranaense
Campeonato Paranaense: 1998

Vasco da Gama
Campeonato Brasileiro Série A: 2000
Copa Mercosur: 2000
Campeonato Carioca: 2003

Cruzeiro
Campeonato Mineiro: 2006, 2008, 2009, 2011, 2014, 2018, 2019
Campeonato Brasileiro Série A: 2013, 2014
Copa do Brasil: 2000, 2017, 2018
Copa Libertadores: 2009 (Runner-up)

Fluminense
Taça Guanabara: 2022, 2023
Campeonato Carioca: 2022

International 
Brazil U17
FIFA U-17 World Cup: 1997

Brazil
Copa América: 2004

Individual 
 Bola de Prata: 2010, 2013
 Campeonato Brasileiro Série A Team of the Year: 2010, 2013

See also 
 List of men's footballers with the most official appearances

References

External links 

1980 births
Living people
Sportspeople from Mato Grosso
Brazilian footballers
Association football goalkeepers
Campeonato Brasileiro Série A players
Campeonato Brasileiro Série B players
Club Athletico Paranaense players
Cruzeiro Esporte Clube players
CR Vasco da Gama players
Fluminense FC players
Copa América-winning players
2003 FIFA Confederations Cup players
2004 Copa América players
Brazil youth international footballers
Brazil under-20 international footballers